Viviane Moreira Fernandes (born 29 September 1977), best known as Vivi Fernandez, is a Brazilian model, actress, dancer and former adult actress.

Life and career 
Born in Brasília, Distrito Federal, the daughter of a retired soldier, Fernandes finished high school and then started a course for dental technician that later ended up to become a model. After taking part at the Rede Record show Galera, Fernandes gained notoriety by participating as a dancer to the comedy show Festa do Mallandro hosted by Sérgio Mallandro on Rede Gazeta. In 1999 she sued Mallandro for sexual harassment, assault, threat and duress arguing that these events occurred during the time of the show.

Between 2003 and 2004, Fernandes became known for a series of artistic nudes, some of them made for the magazine Sexy Premium. In 2005, became an adult actress, signing an exclusive contract with producer Brasileirinhas; her first film, Vivi.com.vc, broke sales records and was praised on specialized sites. She appeared in explicit sex scenes with her boyfriend of the time, businessman Mark Hugo. In 2009, Vivi Fernandez did another artistic nude, this time for a special edition of Playboy magazine.

Fernandez also acted as comedian in TV-programs such as A Praça é Nossa and  Sem Controle (both broadcast by SBT), and starred pranks of the show  Programa Sílvio Santos (also SBT). After retiring from adult industry in 2009, she also acted on stage, starring in the comedy plays Tudo em Cima da Cama and A Segunda Dama.

References

External links

Brazilian female adult models
Brazilian pornographic film actresses
1977 births
Living people
Brazilian actresses
People from Brasília